Red Dust is a 1999 Croatian film directed by Zrinko Ogresta. It was Croatia's official Best Foreign Language Film submission at the 72nd Academy Awards, but did not manage to receive a nomination.

Selected for the 56th Mostra Internazionale d'Arte Cinematografica di Venezia (official section), Venezia (Italy, September 1999)

Grand Prix "Golden Anchor" Haifa's 15th International Film Festival - Haifa (Israel, September 1999)

Cast
Ivo Gregurević - Kirby
Kristijan Ugrina - Škrga
Josip Kučan - Crni
Marko Matanović - Zrik
Slaven Knezović - Boss
Mirta Takač - Sonja
Sandra Lončarić - Lidija
Žarko Savić - Otac
Ante Vican - Velecasni Grga

Awards and nominations
Haifa International Film Festival
1999: Won, "Golden Anchor Award" - Zrinko Ogresta

Pula Film Festival
1999: Won, "Audience Award" - Zrinko Ogresta
1999: Won, "Best Direction" - Zrinko Ogresta
1999: Won, "Best Editing" - Josip Podvorac
1999: Won, "Best Screenplay" - Zrinko OgrestaGoran Tribuson
1999: Won, "Best Supporting Actor" - Ante Vican

See also
 List of submissions to the 72nd Academy Awards for Best Foreign Language Film
 List of Croatian submissions for the Academy Award for Best Foreign Language Film

References

External links
 
 

1990s Croatian-language films
1999 films
1990s action drama films
Croatian action drama films
Films set in Zagreb